Umoja is the seventh album by Dutch band BLØF, released on 3 March 2006. It was produced with the help of numerous international artists. 50,000 copies of the album were pre-sold before it was released, and it became the number-one album sold in the Netherlands in the month after its release date. The title of the album is Swahili for "unity".

A documentary about the album was made in September 2007.

Track listing

Personnel

BLØF
 Paskal Jakobsen – vocals, guitar, mandolin
 Bas Kennis – keyboards, accordion, backing vocals
 Peter Slager – bass guitar
 Norman Bonink – drums, percussion, backing vocals

Additional musicians

Binnenstebuiten (Yele)
 Harry Kimani – vocals
 George Odero Achieng – orutu
 Ongeri "Magao" Magati – percussion
 Charles Obuya "Charlotti" Owino – percussion
 Wicyllffe Chagala "Kaboge" Idah – percussion
 Urvin Magarita – percussion
Lyrics translated by Harry Kimani

Mens
 Omar Faruk Tekbilek – zurna, bağlama, percussion

Aanzoek Zonder Ringen
 Kodo
 Tsubasa Hori – oke gun
 Eiichi Saito – oke daiko
 Yoshie Sunahata – oke daiko
 Tomohiro Mitome – chu daiko
 Kazuki Imagai – chu daiko
 Mitsuru Ishizuka – hirado

Hemingway
 Eliades Ochoa – vocals, guitar
 Alberto Rodriguez Pineda – tres
 Haruhiko Kono – quiro
 Gustav Klimt Kwartet
 Arlia de Ruiter – first violin
 Lorre Trytten – second violin
 Mieke Honingh – viola
 Bastiaan van der Werf – cello
Arrangement by Tom Bakker
Lyrics translated by Annet Jimènez Rodriguez and Peter Slager

Wennen Aan September
 Counting Crows
 Adam Duritz – vocals
 David Immerglück – electric guitar, mandolin
Dutch lyrics by Peter Slager, English lyrics by Adam Duritz

Geen Tango
 Carel Kraayenhof – bandoneón
 Orquesta Tipica Sans Souci
 Leonardo Ferreya – violin
 Fabian Bertero – violin
 Guillermo Ferreyra – violin
 Sophie Lussi – violin
 Felipe Ricciardi – bandoneón
 Raúl Salvetti – bandoneón
 Afredo Gomez – bandoneón
 Eleonora Ferreyra – bandoneón
 Silvio Acosta – double bass
 Leonardo Fabricio Fernández – piano
Arrangement by Carel Kraayenhof and Tom Bakker

Laag Bij De Grond
 Femi Kuti – vocals, saxophone
 Saidi Obara – percussion
 Adekunle Adeyemi – percussion
 Tiwalade Ogunlowo – trombone
 Emmanuel Abowoba – saxophone
 Olugbenga Laleye – trumpet
 Tayo Olajide – vocals, dancing
 Anthonia Bernards – vocals, dancing
 Yemi Oriyomi – vocals, dancing
 Comfort Adenike Michael – vocals, dancing
 Olayinka Anjorin – vocals, dancing

Herinnering Aan Later
 Cristina Branco – vocals
 Custódio Castelo – Portuguese guitar
Lyrics translated by Mila Vidal Paletti, Cristina Branco, and Peter Slager

Vreemde Wegen
 Terry Woods – bouzouki, concertina
 Paul Harrigan – uilleann pipes, tin whistle
 Shane Martin – bodhrán

Donker Hart
 Natalia Sergeeva – violin
 Liana Zingarenko – violin
 Olga Vikovisheva – viola
 Liubov Pavlova – cello
 Elena Abrosimova – double bass
Arrangement by Peter Bauwens

Een Manier Om Thuis Te Komen
 Jigme Drukpa – vocals, dranyen, lingm
 Ugyen Tshewang – cymbals
 Dung Norbu – French horn
 Tsagay – horn
 Tashi Wangchuk – drum

De Hemel Is De Aarde
 Mark Atkins – didgeridoo
 Mark Robinson – didgeridoo
 Bronson – vocals, clapsticks

Eén En Alleen
 Pravin Godkhindi – bansuri
 Rafiuddin Sabri – tabla
 L. Kishore Kumar – sitar
 Santosh Mishra – sarangi
 Dhroeh Nankoe – vocals

References

2006 albums
EMI Records albums
BLØF albums